Fabian Norberg (born July 13, 1995) is a Swedish ice hockey defenceman. He is currently playing with Modo Hockey of the Swedish Hockey League (SHL).

Norberg made his Swedish Hockey League debut playing with Modo Hockey during the 2013–14 SHL season.

References

External links

1995 births
Living people
Modo Hockey players
Swedish ice hockey defencemen